Barry Peterson may refer to:

 Barry Peterson (Republican), Idaho Republican Party chairman
 Barry Peterson (cinematographer), Canadian/American cinematographer

See also
 Barry Petersen, CBS News correspondent
 Barry Pederson (born 1961), Canadian professional ice hockey player